The generalized star-height problem in formal language theory is the open question whether all regular languages can be expressed using generalized regular expressions with a limited nesting depth of Kleene stars.  Here, generalized regular expressions are defined like regular expressions, but they have a built-in complement operator. For a regular language, its generalized star height is defined as the minimum nesting depth of Kleene stars needed in order to describe the language by means of a generalized regular expression, hence the name of the problem. 

More specifically, it is an open question whether a nesting depth of more than 1 is required, and if so, whether there is an algorithm to determine the minimum required star height.

Regular languages of star-height 0 are also known as star-free languages. The theorem of Schützenberger provides an algebraic characterization of star-free languages by means of aperiodic syntactic monoids. In particular star-free languages are a proper decidable subclass of regular languages.

See also 
 Eggan's theorem and Generalized star height sections of the Star height article
 Star height problem

References

External links
 Jean-Eric Pin: The star-height problem

Formal languages
Unsolved problems in computer science
Automata (computation)